Malocampa piratica is a moth of the family Notodontidae. It is found in Costa Rica. However, a specimen was found in Guatemala.

The larvae feed on Cecropia, Coussapoa and Pourouma species.

References

Moths described in 1906
Notodontidae